Méwilo is a 1987 French adventure video game by Coktel Vision.

Development 
It was the first game by Muriel Tramis who was designer and producer at Coktel Vision. It saw a new direction for the developer, which had previously released strategy games. Tramis “proposed to program a game that [she] thought totally original", which became Mewilo. The head of the Coktel Vision, Roland Oskian, allowed her to develop her own story, and she began work in 1986. Collaborating with Martiniquan créolité writer Patrick Chamoiseau the game was inspired by the Caribbean legend of jars of gold. It was graphic designed by Philippe Truca. The software was accompanied by a short story by Chamoiseau.

Plot and gameplay 
Set in the town of Saint-Pierre, Martinique on May 7, 1902, the game takes place a day before Mount Pelée is set to erupt, causing catastrophic damage. The player is a parapsychologist called into town to investigate zombie sightings.

Release and aftermath 
Tramis suggests that while the game was a failure in France, Mewilo performed better in Germany due to the country being "tinged with colonialism".

For the 30th anniversary, Tramis created a crowdfunding campaign to create a remake.

Critical reception 
Atari Magazine praised the "excellent graphics, which can hardly be surpassed in terms of color and richness of detail"; it also highlighted the German localisation. Joystick deemed it an "exciting and instructive adventure", highlighting themes of slavery and the social ills of the tropical plantations. Aktueller Software Markt felt it was "very complex and extensive", and praised the "thought-out story' which "included the cultural and social background of [Tramis'] home country". Additionally, the magazine wrote "Tramis understood how to create a captivating atmosphere through the interesting and realistic background of the story". Amstar Magazine thought the game was original in its subject and execution, far from the traditional adventures games containing monsters and dungeons.

Am Magazine praised its "cultural dimension" which it felt was "rarely found among its colleagues in adventure games". Generation 4 described it an "educational adventure game" and wished more games in this sub-genre would be released. Amiga News felt the software "leaves something to be desired", commenting that the "animation (for the rare times when there is some...) is sloppy and jerky". Tilt wrote it offered a "real dive into the Caribbean soul, all at the same time complex, passionate, violent and irremediably marked by the claws of its history (slavery)".

Awards and nominations 
Tramis asserts that the city of Paris gave her a silver medal for the work.

See also 
 Freedom: Les Guerriers de l'Ombre / Freedom: Rebels in the Darkness (fr) the follow-up 1988 game by Coktel Vision.

References 

1987 video games
Video games developed in France
Video games set in 1902
Video games set in Martinique
Adventure games